Peder Anker (8 December 1749 – 10 December 1824) was a prominent Norwegian landowner, businessman and politician. He served as the prime minister of Norway from 1814 until 1822.

Biography
Peder Anker was a member of a Danish-Norwegian noble family. He was born in Christiania, the son of the wealthy merchant Christian Ancher. He had three brothers Iver (1745–1772), Bernt (1746–1805) and Jess (1753–1798). Following education in Christiania and a year as student at the University of Copenhagen, Peder Anker  and his brothers spent five years traveling with private tutors in Great Britain, France, Germany, and Italy. They were pupils of the noted Swedish naturalist Carl von Linné at Uppsala University in 1764. He was granted Danish nobility in 1778 and was awarded the title of General War Commissioner in 1788.

Peder Anker bought Bogstad Manor with additional forest land and extended the existing house to make a splendid mansion. Bogstad had for about 100 years belonged to members of the Leuch family, his grandmother's family. He also acquired iron mines and foundries, notably Bærums Verk and Hakadal Verk. The Vækerø manor (Vækerø gård) near Oslo was established as a port for the export of lumber. Anker rose to become one of Norway's richest individuals.

Peder Anker was a delegate to the Norwegian Constituent Assembly at Eidsvoll in 1814, representing Akershus Amt. He distinguished himself as a "unionist", whose members opposed complete independence for Norway.  On 18 November 1814 he was appointed Prime Minister of Norway to Stockholm after the Union between Sweden and Norway was established, and remained in this office until 30 June 1822.

Honors
Peder Anker was decorated with the Royal Order of the Seraphim and the Order of Charles XIII. He was awarded the Grand Cross of the Order of Dannebrog in 1812. In 1815, he was elected a member of the Royal Swedish Academy of Sciences.

Legacy
Several roads in Norway have been named in honor of Peder Anker  including Peder Ankers vei in  Jar, Peder Anker gate in Halden, and Peder Ankers Plass in Oslo.

References

Other sources
Frydenlund, Bård  (2009) Stormannen Peder Anker : en biografi (Oslo: Aschehoug)   
Government Administration Services  Peder Anker

Related Reading
Holmøyvik, Eirik  (2012) Maktfordeling og 1814 (Bergen, Fagbokforlaget)

External links

Fathers of the Constitution of Norway
Prime Ministers of Norway
Presidents of the Storting
Norwegian expatriates in Sweden
Grand Crosses of the Order of the Dannebrog
University of Copenhagen alumni
Members of the Royal Swedish Academy of Sciences
Knights of the Order of Charles XIII
1749 births
1824 deaths
Peder
Norwegian landowners
18th-century Norwegian businesspeople
19th-century Norwegian businesspeople